Madeirinha River is a river of Mato Grosso and Amazonas states in north-western Brazil, a left tributary of the Roosevelt River.

Course

In Mato Grosso the river forms the western boundary of the  Rio Madeirinha Ecological Station, a fully protected environmental unit created in 1997.
It then flows north east through the Tucumã State Park in Mato Grosso and the  Manicoré State Forest in Amazonas, a sustainable use conservation unit created in 2005.
It continues north east from the state forest before joining the Roosevelt river.

See also
List of rivers of Amazonas
List of rivers of Mato Grosso

References

Sources

Rivers of Amazonas (Brazilian state)
Rivers of Mato Grosso